Manikrao Govindrao Thakare (born 22 August 1954) is an Indian politician from the state of Maharashtra. He is a senior leader of Congress.

He was previously a member of the Maharashtra Legislative Assembly from the Indian National Congress from 1985 until 2004 from Darwha (Vidhan Sabha constituency) Constituency.

He was later given the Energy Ministry portfolio during Jan 2003 - 2004 and in July 2004, he was one of 22 ministers to be dropped as minister by the then Chief Minister of Maharashtra Sushilkumar Shinde.

Manikrao has been a vocal critic of the Bharatiya Janata Party - Shiv Sena alliance government which ruled Maharashtra up to 1999, especially its handling of the Srikrishna Commission. On July 27, 1998, Manikrao along with R R Patil demanded that the Justice Shrikrishna Commission report be tabled on the floor of the assembly. This forced an adjournment of the assembly. His relentless criticism of the then government in the legislature ensured that when the government lost its mandate.  Manikrao Thakare was appointed as AICC incharge of Telangana affairs on 4 January 2023.

References 

Marathi politicians
1954 births
Members of the Maharashtra Legislative Council
Living people
Maharashtra MLAs 1985–1990
Maharashtra MLAs 1990–1995
Maharashtra MLAs 1995–1999
Maharashtra MLAs 1999–2004
Indian National Congress politicians from Maharashtra